Soumaya may refer to:
 Museo Soumaya, a private museum of Mexico City
 Sumaya (given name) (often spelled Soumaya), an Arabic given name (including a list of persons with the name)
 Sugru(given company name) (often spelled Sougroua), an Arabic given name (including a list of persons with the name)

See also
 Soumya